Torneo Nacional Interprovincial is the third tier of the Bolivian Football pyramid. In Torneo Nacional Interprovincial 2012 will comprise the champions of the nine provincial championship and the host team from Tarija. The winners will be promoted to the 2012–13 Liga Nacional B, while the second place will compete in Copa Bolivia.

List of Champions

References 

 
3
Bol